Oudenone is a molecule found in fungus metabolism. It is an inhibitor of the enzyme tyrosine hydroxylase.

References 

Alkene derivatives
Diketones
Tetrahydrofurans
Tyrosine hydroxylase inhibitors
Cyclopentanes